"Cold Turkey" is a song written by English singer-songwriter John Lennon, released as a single in 1969 by the Plastic Ono Band on Apple Records, catalogue Apples 1001 in the United Kingdom, Apple 1813 in the United States. It is the second solo single issued by Lennon and it peaked at number 30 on the Billboard Hot 100 and number 14 on the UK Singles Chart. The song's first appearance on an album was Live Peace in Toronto 1969 where the song had been performed live on 13 September 1969 with Lennon reading the lyrics off a clip-board.

Writing and recording
According to Peter Brown in his book The Love You Make, the song was written in a "creative outburst" following Lennon and Yoko Ono going "cold turkey" from their brief heroin addictions. Brown states that Lennon presented the song to Paul McCartney as a potential single by The Beatles, as they were finishing recording for their Abbey Road album, but it was refused and eventually released as a Plastic Ono Band single with sole writing credits to him.

"Cold Turkey" was the first song Lennon wrote for which he took sole credit; his previous compositions, including his first single release, "Give Peace a Chance", were attributed to the Lennon–McCartney partnership, although the credit for "Give Peace a Chance" was later changed to Lennon alone. "Cold Turkey" was recorded in Abbey Road Studio 2, and features Eric Clapton. There are other versions besides the single, several of which are acoustic, and a live version included on Live in New York City that features Ono adding vocalizations.

Release and reception
The single was released with a standard green Apple label, with the words "Play Loud" printed on the spindle plug of the UK pressing and above and beneath the spindle hole of the US pressing. This instruction would also appear on the labels of Lennon's next solo single, "Instant Karma!"

Cash Box described the song as "brilliant, controversial and an absolute smash." "Cold Turkey" rose to number 14 on the UK Singles Chart on 15 November 1969. On 22 November, "Cold Turkey" dropped to number 15, and on 25 November Lennon returned his MBE to Buckingham Palace saying "I am returning this MBE in protest against Britain's involvement in the Nigeria-Biafra thing, against our support of America in Vietnam, and against 'Cold Turkey' slipping down the charts. With love, John Lennon of Bag." In March 2005, Q magazine placed "Cold Turkey" at number 74 in its list of the 100 Greatest Guitar Tracks.

Cover art 
The original single cover art features Lennon's head with glasses on an X-ray image. An alternative sleeve with the X-ray photographs of John and Yoko side by side, rather than on either side of the cover, was issued in several European countries. The Japanese version includes a colour photo of both in a smaller size.

Live performance
Its first public performance on 13 September 1969, was recorded and released on the Live Peace in Toronto 1969 album by Plastic Ono Band which included Lennon, Yoko Ono, Eric Clapton, Klaus Voormann, and Alan White. Yoko introduced it as the newest song written by John; John added that the band had never played the song together as a group before. He also performed this song on 15 December 1969, along with "Don't Worry Kyoko (Mummy's Only Looking for Her Hand in the Snow)", at the Lyceum Ballroom with more members of the Plastic Ono Band. This version would be available on his Some Time in New York City album. Lennon performed the song again, at two Madison Square Garden shows, on 30 August 1972.

Personnel
According to author John C. Winn:

John Lennon lead and harmony vocals, guitars
Eric Clapton guitar
Klaus Voormann bass
Ringo Starr drums

Chart performance

Cover versions
 Freddie Hubbard recorded an instrumental jazz version in 1970, as an outtake from his CTI Records album, Red Clay. Hubbard's version, featuring Herbie Hancock, Joe Henderson, Ron Carter and Lenny White, is influenced by funk music.
 A live recording appears on the 1979 LP A Can of Bees by the Soft Boys.
 The Godfathers recorded a version in 1986 with producer Vic Maile. It was first released on a 1986 compilation album called Hit by Hit that included their three early 12" singles.
 PiL founder/guitarist Keith Levene covered the song on his 1989 solo album Violent Opposition.
 Cheap Trick recorded two versions in 1994. One went on the album Working Class Hero: A Tribute to John Lennon, and the other was released on one of the Bun E.'s Basement Bootleg albums.
 Beki Bondage of Vice Squad released a version on her 2000 solo covers album, also called Cold Turkey.
 Lenny Kravitz recorded a version for the 2007 benefit album Instant Karma: The Amnesty International Campaign to Save Darfur.
 Billy Talent covered it on the B-side of their single "Rusted from the Rain" in 2009.
 Alice Cooper covered the song with his supergroup Hollywood Vampires on their debut album, released 11 September 2015. "We weren't going to do 'Imagine'," he noted. "'Let's do something that really represented the John that we knew."

References

Sources

External links
John Lennon - Cold Turkey at Graham Calkin's Beatles Pages

John Lennon songs
Apple Records singles
1969 singles
Songs written by John Lennon
Songs about heroin
Song recordings produced by John Lennon
Song recordings produced by Yoko Ono
Cheap Trick songs
1969 songs
Blues rock songs
British hard rock songs
Plastic Ono Band songs